Sir Richard Cust, 1st Baronet (23 June 1622 – 30 August 1700) was a British barrister and Member of Parliament.

Cust was the son of Samuel Cust and Ann Burrell. He represented Lincolnshire in the House of Commons in 1653 and Stamford from 1679 to 1685. In 1677 he was created a Baronet, of Stamford in the County of Lincoln.

Cust married Beatrice Pury, daughter of William Pury, on 29 August 1644. He died in August 1700, aged 78, and was succeeded by his grandson Richard Cust. The latter's son Sir John Cust, 3rd Baronet, served as Speaker of the House of Commons from 1761 to 1770.

References

1622 births
1700 deaths
Baronets in the Baronetage of England
17th-century English lawyers
English MPs 1653 (Barebones)
English MPs 1679
English MPs 1680–1681
English MPs 1681
Richard